First Facet is a steep ice-free bluff rising just eastward of Second Facet, forming a part of the north wall of Debenham Glacier in Victoria Land, Antarctica. It was charted and descriptively named by the British Antarctic Expedition, 1910–13, under Robert Falcon Scott.

References 

Cliffs of Victoria Land
Scott Coast